Tharparkar is a region in Sindh, Pakistan.

Tharparkar may also refer to:
Tharparkar District, an administrative unit of Sindh, Pakistan
Tharparkar cattle, a type of cattle.

See also